In an effort to create a more sustainable environment, Clemson University, located in Clemson, South Carolina, has developed several initiatives to conserve energy and educate students along with the public about fossil fuels and natural resources. Clemson has set both short- and long-term goals, on a scale of up to 15 years. Known as the Solid Green campaign, Clemson has a mission to reduce total energy used by 20% in the year 2020, reach a goal of becoming net-zero in carbon emissions, and replace the coal-fired boiler in 2015. Clemson has the long-term desire to become much more energy efficient, climate considerate and recycle more. One way of funding these initiatives is the Student Sustainability Fee, also known as the Green Fee, which students can elect to pay $10 with their tuition each semester.

Recycling Initiative 

Starting out as a campaign to eliminate litter on campus in 2006, the Solid Green initiative has progressed to achieve other goals. One such example is Gameday Recycling, which was started in 2009 and has exponentially increased in tonnage recycled. This project involves over 80,000 people on any given home weekend, a way for Clemson University to educate the public about the Solid Green campaign. Trash bags are placed at each parking spot and volunteers go around after the games collecting the trash and taking it to the recycling center. Recycling bins are placed in each dorm room with recycling containers at the base of each dormitory. Offices and classrooms on campus have completely replaced regular waste bins with recycling bins. There is also a massive recycling center at Kite Hill, which is open to anyone. Clemson students compete in RecycleMania each year, a nationwide event in which college campuses compete to recycle the most waste. At Cherry Crossing Research Facility, the community can drop off unused food for compost, or yard waste to be recycled as mulch, an extra effort by the university to decrease their carbon footprint. University faculty and staff are strongly encouraged to take advantage of the opportunities around campus to recycle and to educate their students about the importance of conserving our valuable resources. The importance of recycling is evident anywhere on campus with the display of recycling bins, reminders to conserve energy, and Solid Green paraphernalia.

LEED Certification 

Clemson University hopes to achieve their goal of obtaining the LEED silver rating for all newly constructed buildings. LEED, or Leadership in Energy and Environmental Design, is a program that awards the buildings with the best building strategies based on a point system in order to achieve different levels of certification.  “The LEED® green building certification program is the nationally accepted benchmark for the design, construction, and operation of green buildings. It contains prerequisites and credits in five categories: sustainable site planning, improving energy efficiency, conserving materials and resources, embracing indoor environmental quality, and safeguarding water” (LEED projects). Clemson has numerous projects through which they aim to achieve LEED certification. The Baruch Institute, the Duke Energy Innovation Center, and the Fraternity Quad are just a few examples of the projects that will be completed. Clemson University chose to participate in this project because they believe the LEED projects will allow them to be considered environmentally friendly. This certificate show that they have satisfied the qualifications that the LEED claims to be environmentally friendly.

Energy Reduction and Carbon Emissions 

Clemson has made their plan to become sustainable publicly by creating specific goals that they hope to achieve. One goal is described by the 20/20 plan. This means that Clemson is striving to reduce energy use on campus 20% per gross square foot of building space by the year 2020. The most significant way they are doing this is installing solar panels on two pre-existing buildings, the Fluor Daniel Engineering Innovation Building and the Life Sciences Building. Another way they are implementing this goal is by replacing old lightbulbs to LEDs throughout campus. So far, they have changed half of the campus from the old lightbulbs to the new lightbulbs. Another goal Clemson is trying to reach through the Solid Green campaign is for Clemson to become carbon neutral. The main way they are trying to do this is by having the CATbus system. This is lowering carbon emissions because many students are riding the bus to and from classes instead of driving. There are buses that go to a number of off campus housing complexes along with around campus. They believe that this allows students to appreciate the convenience of not having to find parking on campus along with not having to walk as far to class.

Other Notable Accomplishments 

In addition to the specific goals of the Solid Green initiative, Clemson also offers several organizations in which students and faculty can take part in. Students for Environmental Action began in 1992 and the club works on several different environmental projects each year, their most successful being the founding of the Student Sustainability Initiative, supported by the Green Fee. Clemson also has a student-led organic farm, which is dedicated to “research, education, and public outreach programs.” Sustainability Week will be February 18–22, 2015.

References 

Clemson University